Pucheni is a commune in Dâmbovița County, Muntenia, Romania with a population of 1,861 people. It is composed of five villages: Brădățel, Meișoare, Pucheni, Valea Largă, and Vârfureni.

The commune is located in the northern part of the county, on the border with Argeș County.

Natives
 Andreea Părăluță

References

Communes in Dâmbovița County
Localities in Muntenia